Miami Township is one of the fourteen townships of Clermont County, Ohio, United States. The population at the 2010 census was 40,848, up from 36,632 in 2000.  The township's students are served mostly by Milford Exempted Village Schools.

Geography

Located in the northwestern corner of the county, it borders the following townships:
Hamilton Township, Warren County - north
Goshen Township - northeast
Stonelick Township - southeast
Union Township - south
Anderson Township, Hamilton County - southwest corner
Columbia Township, Hamilton County - southwest, north of Anderson Township
Symmes Township, Hamilton County - west

Many populated places are located in Miami Township:
Part of the city of Loveland, in the north
Part of the city of Milford, in the southwest
The census-designated place of Day Heights, in the center
The census-designated place of Mount Repose, in the center
The census-designated place of Mulberry, in the west
The unincorporated community of Miamiville, in the west.

Name and history
Other Miami Townships in the state of Ohio are located in Greene, Hamilton, Logan, and Montgomery counties. Miami Township was created in 1801 as O'Bannon Township, after O'Bannon Creek, a tributary of the Little Miami River that runs through the township. O'Bannon Creek was named for Clermont County's first surveyor. The particular stretch of the circle highway Interstate 275 was completed in 1975, built through the middle of the community.

Government

In 1991, the state legislature and George Voinovich adopted "Limited Home Rule Townships" as a schism from the Ohio Constitution's Municipal Home Rule established in 1912. The alteration devolved township government to be similar to municipalities but without full home rule, a city code, comprehensive zoning, among a host of other traits. The result is many developed townships which would have sought shared municipal incorporation with cities or villages have not maximized property value and do not have basic support for services and infrastructure, relying exclusively on reduced state funding—much of which comes from federal investments for roadwork.  The autonomy which was sought has effectively been unable to reserve responsibility for the community and instead outsourced that responsibility to state intervention.  

The township is governed by a three-member board of trustees, who are elected in November of odd-numbered years to a four-year term beginning on the following January 1. Two are elected in the year after the presidential election and one is elected in the year before it. There is also an elected township fiscal officer, who serves a four-year term beginning on April 1 of the year after the election, which is held in November of the year before the presidential election. Vacancies in the fiscal officership or on the board of trustees are filled by the remaining trustees. As of late 2015, the board was composed of Karl Schultz, Ken Tracy, and Mary Makley Wolff, and the fiscal officer was Eric C. Ferry.

News service
The Clermont Sun is the county newspaper while the Eastside Press serves the eastern communities of Greater Cincinnati, both catering to Milford-Miami Township.

See also
 Milford High School (Ohio)
 Clermont County, Ohio

References

External links
Township website
County website

Townships in Clermont County, Ohio
1801 establishments in the Northwest Territory
Populated places established in 1801
Townships in Ohio